Joseph Andrew Dixon (June 3, 1879 – July 4, 1942) was a U.S. Representative from Ohio.

Early life and career
Born in Cincinnati, Ohio, Dixon attended St. Patrick's School, Hughes High School, and Xavier University in Cincinnati. He served as clerk in a mercantile store 1893-1900. He engaged in retail clothing business in Anderson, Indiana, Hartford City, Indiana, and Cincinnati. He also was manager and owner of amateur and professional baseball teams. Active in young men's welfare work.

Congress 

Dixon was elected as a Democrat to the Seventy-fifth Congress (January 3, 1937 – January 3, 1939).
He was an unsuccessful candidate for reelection in 1938 to the Seventy-sixth Congress and for election in 1940 to the Seventy-seventh Congress.

Later career and death 
He resumed his former business pursuits in Cincinnati, Ohio, until his death there on July 4, 1942.
He was interred in St. Joseph's Cemetery.

Sources

1879 births
1942 deaths
Politicians from Cincinnati
Xavier University alumni
Democratic Party members of the United States House of Representatives from Ohio